CBV SmallCap is a stock market index indicating the stock prices of 30 out of 73 small-size companies in Vietnam. The small-size companies are classified as those having total market capital from VND 50 billion to 150 billion with highest liquidity in this small-capitalization group. 

CBV SmallCap, CBV MidCap, CBV Index form the broader CBV Total.

External links
Overview of CBV SmallCap from Bien Viet Securities JSC
List of Companies in CBV SmallCap

Vietnamese stock market indices